Carolyne H. Barry (born Carole Stuppler, July 20, 1943 – June 16, 2015) was an American dancer and dance instructor.

Barry was born in Brooklyn, New York.  The oldest of four children, she attended UCLA with a dance major and theatre arts minor. She was on the board of the UCLA Theatre Arts Alumni, was a member of the Academy of Television Arts & Sciences, and was founder/director of Entertainment Industry Educators.

Dancer
After years of training, at nineteen, Barry started her dance career at the Melodyland Summer Stock Theatre in Anaheim, California. She went on to be a featured dancer, for two years, as the “Girl with the Horn-rimmed glasses” on the ABC television show Shindig!. (For this show she recorded the hit record “The Girl with The Horn-rimmed Glasses” which became an international bestseller.)

Actress
Barry performed in over 400 national television commercials, thirty-two theatrical productions and approximately one hundred television shows and movies, including appearances in the classic Star Trek episode "Arena" and the Next Generation episode "Home Soil".

Teacher
From 1983–1989, Barry founded and ran the Professional Artist Group, which was the largest training and casting facility in the country.  During this time she created formats for casting director and director workshops which have gone on to be a staple for the training and marketing of many actors in major markets.

Since 1982, The Carolyne Barry Workshops have been one of the most successful independent full training programs in Hollywood.  Barry trained thousands of professional actors. Recommended by agents, casting directors, and former students, she was recognized as one of the top commercial audition teachers.  In 2009, she was the winner of Backstage West Favorite Commercial Teacher in Los Angeles.

Barry was featured as a teaching authority in The Hollywood Reporter, L.A. Reader, The Examiner, as well as on CNN, KHJ (AM), KTTV and numerous TV and Radio talk shows throughout the country.  In 2008, Barry wrote the Commercial Break column for Backstage West.

Director
Barry directed dozens of on-camera (one and three cameras) sales presentations, pilot presentations, training videos and actor presentations as well as five theatrical productions in New York City and Los Angeles. In 1995, she co-created and directed ‘Hysterical Blindness’ a musical comedy that ran in Los Angeles for five months before it went to off-Broadway where it had an extensive run.

Casting director
Barry did commercial casting for numerous top directors and advertising agencies, and cast more than 600 national and regional commercial campaigns.

Writer
In 1976, Barry co-wrote and starred in the film Dark August, which enjoyed wide distribution and is still in video release.

Author
Barry created Lights, Camera, Kids, a DVD program that helps kids start their careers and co-created the CD program, Getting The Job, to help actors do their best at auditions (currently in distribution).

She also wrote Hit the Ground Running, designed to help new actors start and succeed in their acting careers.

References

External links
 
 
 http://www.hitthegroundrunningbook.com
 https://www.youtube.com/watch?v=2A_vgSqVr-w

1943 births
2015 deaths
American female dancers
Dancers from New York (state)
UCLA School of the Arts and Architecture alumni
American actresses
21st-century American women